David A. Evans (born May 3, 1945) is an American politician and a Republican member of the West Virginia House of Delegates representing District 4 since January 12, 2013.

Education
Evans earned his BA in education from Glenville State College and his master's degree from West Virginia University.

Elections
2012 When District 4 Democratic Representative Scott Varner retired and left the seat open, Evans was unopposed for the May 8, 2012 Republican Primary, winning with 2,157 votes, and placed second in the three-way two-position November 6, 2012 General election with 6,927 votes (31.2%) behind incumbent Democratic Representative Michael Ferro and ahead of Democratic nominee David Sidiropolis.

References

External links
Official page at the West Virginia Legislature

David Evans at Ballotpedia
David Evans at the National Institute on Money in State Politics

1945 births
Living people
Glenville State College alumni
Republican Party members of the West Virginia House of Delegates
People from Kanawha County, West Virginia
People from Marshall County, West Virginia
West Virginia University alumni
21st-century American politicians